The Hypnotist is a 1957 British thriller film directed by Montgomery Tully and starring Paul Carpenter, Patricia Roc and Roland Culver. It follows a hypnotist who attempts to convince one of his patients to murder the hypnotist's wife, whom he has grown sick of. It was based on a play by Falkland Cary. The film was released as Scotland Yard Dragnet in the U.S.

Cast
 Roland Culver ...  Dr. Francis Pelham
 Patricia Roc ...  Mary Foster
 Paul Carpenter ...  Valentine 'Val' Neal
 William Hartnell ...  Inspector Ross
 Gordon Needham ...  Detective Sergeant Davis
 Edgar Driver ...  Atkins, the porter
 Tom Tann ...  Wang, the houseboy
 Ellen Pollock ...  Miss Barbara Barton
 Robert Sansom ...  Senior Test Flight Official
 Martin Wyldeck ...  Dr. Bradford
 John Serret ...  Dr. Martin
 Oliver Johnston ...  Dr. Kenyon
 Kay Callard ...  Jazz Club Blonde
 Tim Fitzgerald ...  Val as a boy
 Mary Jones ...  Val's Mother

Critical reception
The Radio Times wrote "Irish-born director Montgomery Tully was one of the key figures in the British B-movie industry during the 1950s and 1960s. This is one of his better efforts, as psychiatrist Roland Culver attempts to frame disturbed test pilot Paul Carpenter for the murder of his wife. Culver does a nice line in evil manipulation and Patricia Roc is typically spirited as the girlfriend standing by her man";
while TV Guide wrote, "the film drags on and on, going nowhere and taking too long to get there."

References

External links

1957 films
1950s thriller films
British thriller films
Films directed by Montgomery Tully
Films about hypnosis
1950s English-language films
1950s British films